Ángel Nahuel Gómez (born 29 August 2001) is an Argentine professional footballer who plays as a midfielder for Racing Club.

Career
Gómez is a product of the Racing Club youth system, having joined them at the age of six. He was moved into the first-team in late-2020 under manager Sebastián Beccacece, who subsequently selected him to make his senior debut off the bench against Atlético Tucumán on 19 November; playing the final moments of a 2–0 loss in the Copa de la Liga Profesional.

Career statistics
.

Notes

References

External links

2001 births
Living people
Sportspeople from Buenos Aires Province
Argentine footballers
Association football midfielders
Racing Club de Avellaneda footballers